Beta Ethniki 2003–04 complete season.

League table

Results 

1 The opponents of Fostiras awarded a 2–0 w/o win each.
2 The opponents of Panachaiki awarded a 2–0 w/o win each.
3 Game did not held

Promotion play-off

Ergotelis were promoted to 2004–05 Alpha Ethniki. Akratitos were relegated to 2004–05 Beta Ethniki.

Relegation play-off

Ilisiakos were promoted to 2004–05 Beta Ethniki. PAS Giannina were relegated to 2004–05 Gamma Ethniki.

Top scorers

References

External links 
RSSSF.org

Second level Greek football league seasons
Greece
2